St John-at-Hampstead is a Church of England parish church dedicated to St John the Evangelist (though the original dedication was only refined from St John to this in 1917 by the Bishop of London) in Church Row, Hampstead, London.

History

Hampstead was granted to the Benedictine monks of Westminster Abbey by charter in 986. It is likely that they placed a church there soon afterwards, but the first records of one come from 1312 (when it was recorded that John de Neuport was its priest) and 1333 (through a mention of a Chapel dedicated to the Blessed Virgin Mary). On the Dissolution of the Monasteries, the Abbey was replaced by the Bishop of Westminster, with its first and only holder Thomas Thirlby also serving as St John's rector. Thirlby appointed Thomas Chapelyne to be St John's vicar in 1545, but the see was abolished in 1551 by Edward VI, with the manor and benefice of Hampstead being granted to Sir Thomas Wrothe. The church of this era was part in stone and part in timber, and also had a minor wooden tower.

As Hampstead grew in popularity and size as an out-of-town health resort, the small existing church grew less and less adequate and derelict, being finally declared unusable by 1744. A new church was built on designs by Henry Flitcroft and John Sanderson, and dedicated on 8 October 1747 by the Bishop of Llandaff (as commissary of the Diocesan). However, by 1827 this was again too small, though initial plans by Lewis Vulliamy were rejected as too expensive and it took until 1843 for extension plans by Robert Hesketh to be agreed upon. This extended the church 30 ft westwards by means of transepts, adding 524 more seats. In 1853 the church had its first Willis organ built (it was replaced in 1883 and repaired in 1997), with Henry Willis himself employed as the organist, and in 1871 plans were mooted for 'beautifying and improving' the church. These plans originally involved the demolition of the tower, but this was shelved on protests from William Morris, Edward Burne-Jones, Holman Hunt, Ford Madox Brown, Anthony Trollope, George du Maurier, Coventry Patmore, F. T. Palgrave, George Gilbert Scott Jr. and others, in favour of simple extensions westwards in 1877–78 designed by F.P. Cockerell (though these extensions moved the church's high altar to the geographical west end, rather than the more usual east end).

In 1911–12 the Vestries were improved by Temple Moore, who also added a Morning Chapel, whilst in 1958 the dark Victorian interior scheme was removed and the original lighter, whitewashed scheme reinstated. The building is Grade I listed.

Music

The church has a fine musical tradition stretching back as far as Henry Willis. Under the direction of Martindale Sidwell it developed a national and international reputation as being a centre of excellence for parish music, which it maintains today with a fully professional choir as well as a junior choir and regular high-profile concerts.

Organ

The early records of organs date from the middle of the 18th century. The current organ was installed by Henry Willis in 1884. Restoration and rebuilding work was undertaken by Harrison and Harrison in 1964, and Bower and Co in 2000. A specification of the organ can be found on the National Pipe Organ Register. and on the parish website.

Organists
Samuel Reay 1854–56
James Shaw 1874-95
George Aitken 1894–1942
Martindale Sidwell 1947–92
Simon Lawford 1993–94
Lee Ward 1994–2012
James Sherlock 2012–2017
 Peter Foggitt 2018–2021
 Geoffrey Webber 2021–present

Voluntary rate
By virtue of the Parochial Church Councils (Powers) Measure 1956, parochial church councils are entitled to levy a voluntary rate and, in 1986, Hampstead Parish Church's PCC decided to supplement their millennium redecoration appeal by this means. The levying of a voluntary rate on businesses and residents alike has now become a regular annual event.

Churchyard

Notable individuals buried in its churchyard include:

Eliza Acton, food writer
George Atherton Aitken, author and biographer
Herbert Beerbohm Tree, actor and theatre-manager
Walter Besant, novelist and historian
John Constable, romantic painter
Peter Cook, writer and comedian
Henry Cort, ironmaster and inventor
Eleanor Farjeon, author
Penelope Fitzgerald, author, daughter of E.V. Knox
Hugh Gaitskell, Labour Party leader from 1955 until 1963
Eva Gore-Booth and Esther Roper, suffragists and social justice campaigners
John Harrison, inventor of the marine chronometer
C. E. M. Joad, philosopher
Kay Kendall, actress, film star of the 1950s
E.V. Knox, poet and satirist, editor of Punch (1932-1949)
Mary Knox (née Shepard), illustrator of P.L. Travers' Mary Poppins stories, daughter of E.H. Shepard, wife of E.V. Knox
Arthur Llewelyn Davies and his wife Sylvia (née du Maurier) who befriended J M Barrie and whose children inspired Peter Pan
Jack and Peter Llewelyn Davies (children of the above) in the same grave as their parents and their brother Michael, in a separate grave
John Llewelyn Davies, preacher and theologian, father of Arthur Llewelyn Davies and Margaret Llewelyn Davies
George du Maurier, author and cartoonist, father of Gerald du Maurier and Sylvia Llewelyn Davies
Gerald du Maurier, actor and manager, father of Daphne du Maurier, novelist, and brother of Sylvia Llewelyn Davies
Temple Moore, architect
Nicholas Parsons, actor and radio and television presenter
Langford Reed, scriptwriter and director
George Gilbert Scott Jr., architect working in late Gothic and Queen Anne revival styles, eldest son of Sir George Gilbert Scott, father of Sir Giles Gilbert Scott and Adrian Gilbert Scott, all also architects
Richard Norman Shaw, Architect
Evelyn Underhill, Anglo-Catholic writer
Anton Walbrook, Austrian actor
Alec Waugh, writer, brother of Evelyn Waugh

The churchyard contains 8 war graves, comprising 6 servicemen from World War I and 2 from World War II.

See also
List of church restorations and alterations by Temple Moore

References

External links

18th-century Church of England church buildings
Buildings and structures in Hampstead
Church of England church buildings in the London Borough of Camden
Commonwealth War Graves Commission cemeteries in England
Grade I listed buildings in the London Borough of Camden
Saint John
Rebuilt churches in the United Kingdom
Temple Moore buildings